The women's trap competition at the 2004 Summer Olympics was held on August 16 at the Markópoulo Olympic Shooting Centre near Athens, Greece. Suzanne Balogh of Australia won the competition by a wide four-hit margin.

The event consisted of two rounds: a qualifier and a final. In the qualifier, each shooter fired 3 sets of 25 targets in trap shooting, with 10 targets being thrown to the left, 10 to the right, and 5 straight-away in each set. The shooters could take two shots at each target.

The top 6 shooters in the qualifying round moved on to the final round. There, they fired one additional round of 25 targets, where only one shot could be taken at each target. The total score from all 100 targets was used to determine final ranking. Ties are broken using a shoot-off; additional shots are fired one at a time until there is no longer a tie.

Australia's Suzanne Balogh battled her way against the gusty winds on a mountaintop range outside Athens to claim the gold medal in this event with a total score of 88 clay pigeons. Spain's María Quintanal took the silver with 84, while South Korea's Lee Bo-na hit 23 out of 25 targets for a combined record of 83 to grab a bronze, overwhelming 17-year-old American high school student Whitly Loper by just one shot.

Normally, no more than one competitor per country would be allowed in this event, but an exception was made for Canada to let Susan Nattrass take use of a redistributed quota place. 28 years after her Olympic debut, Nattrass reached the final but finished sixth.

Records
Prior to this competition, the existing world and Olympic records were as follows.

Qualification round 

Q Qualified for final

Final

References

External links
Official Results

Women's Trap
Olymp
Women's events at the 2004 Summer Olympics